Omar Dadi aur Gharwalay is a 2011 Pakistani Romantic drama aired on ARY Digital. It was directed by Nadeem Baig, produced by 7th Sky Entertainment and Unilever Pakistan, and written by Samina Ejaz. Its title song Mein Sitara Subh-e-Umeed Ka was sung by Rahat Fateh Ali Khan.  Lyrics were written by Faaiz Anwar and composed by Prakash-Ashish.

Cast
 Zuhab Khan
 Noman Ahmed
 Humayun Saeed
 Ahsan Khan
 Nadia Hussain
 Eshita Mehboob
 Hiba Ali
 Arisha Razi
Qaiser Naqvi

Soundtrack
Its title song "Mein Sitara Subh-e-Umeed Ka" was sung by Rahat Fateh Ali Khan, lyrics was written by Faaiz Anwar and composed by Prakash-Ashish.

References

External links
 Official Website

Pakistani drama television series
Urdu-language television shows
Television shows set in Karachi
ARY Digital original programming
2012 Pakistani television series debuts
Films directed by Nadeem Baig (director)